Mason is a village in Bayfield County, Wisconsin, United States. The population was 93 at the 2010 census. The village is located within the Town of Mason.

U.S. Highway 63 serves as a main route in the community.

History
A post office called Mason has been in operation since 1883. The village's name honors Freemasonry.

Geography
Mason is located at  (46.433678, -91.06204).

Mason is located 17 miles southwest of the city of Ashland; and 41 miles northeast of the city of Hayward.

Demographics

2010 census
As of the census of 2010, there were 93 people, 34 households, and 21 families living in the village. The racial makeup of the village was 81.7% White, 5.4% African American, 2.2% Native American, and 10.8% from two or more races. Hispanic or Latino of any race were 3.2% of the population.

There were 34 households, of which 41.2% had children under the age of 18 living with them, 44.1% were married couples living together, 11.8% had a female householder with no husband present, 5.9% had a male householder with no wife present, and 38.2% were non-families. 20.6% of all households were made up of individuals, and 14.7% had someone living alone who was 65 years of age or older. The average household size was 2.74 and the average family size was 2.90.

The median age in the village was 36.2 years. 28% of residents were under the age of 18; 8.5% were between the ages of 18 and 24; 22.6% were from 25 to 44; 28% were from 45 to 64; and 12.9% were 65 years of age or older. The gender makeup of the village was 50.5% male and 49.5% female.

2000 census
As of the census of 2000, there were 72 people, 26 households, and 19 families living in the village. The population density was 141.8 people per square mile (54.5/km2). There were 35 housing units at an average density of 68.9 per square mile (26.5/km2). The racial makeup of the village was 87.50% White, 4.17% Native American, 4.17% Asian, and 4.17% from two or more races.

There were 26 households, out of which 30.8% had children under the age of 18 living with them, 69.2% were married couples living together, 7.7% had a female householder with no husband present, and 23.1% were non-families. 23.1% of all households were made up of individuals, and 7.7% had someone living alone who was 65 years of age or older. The average household size was 2.77 and the average family size was 3.30.

In the village, the population was spread out, with 31.9% under the age of 18, 4.2% from 18 to 24, 26.4% from 25 to 44, 20.8% from 45 to 64, and 16.7% who were 65 years of age or older. The median age was 37 years. For every 100 females, there were 100.0 males. For every 100 females age 18 and over, there were 96.0 males.

The median income for a household in the village was $32,917, and the median income for a family was $34,583. Males had a median income of $19,583 versus $13,125 for females. The per capita income for the village was $12,742. There were 15.4% of families and 30.6% of the population living below the poverty line, including 100.0% of under eighteens and none of those over 64.

Notable people
Thorvald A. Solberg, United States Admiral was born in Mason.
Samuel E. Squires, Wisconsin State Representative was Chairman of Mason.

References

External links
Mason Area Historical Society, Inc.

Villages in Bayfield County, Wisconsin
Villages in Wisconsin